The 2014 Mudsummer Classic was the tenth stock car race of the 2014 NASCAR Camping World Truck Series and the second iteration of the event. The race was held on July 23, 2014, in Rossburg, Ohio at Eldora Speedway, a  permanent oval dirt track. The race was run over 150 laps. Bubba Wallace of Kyle Busch Motorsports would win the race, after dominating and leading 97 laps. This was Wallace's third career win in the truck series, and his second of the season. To fill out the podium, Ron Hornaday Jr. of Turner Scott Motorsports and Ryan Blaney of Brad Keselowski Racing would finish 2nd and 3rd, respectively.

Background 
Located north of Rossburg, Ohio in the village of New Weston, Ohio, it features permanent and festival-style seating believed to be in the range of 30,000. The 22,000 permanent grandstand and VIP suite seats make it the largest sports stadium in the Dayton, Ohio-region according to the Dayton Business Journal.

Entry list 

** - Withdrew prior to the event.

Practice

First practice 
The first 60-minute practice session was held on July 23, 2014, at 10:00 AM CST.

Final practice 
The final 130-minute practice session was held on Wednesday, July 23, at 11:30 AM CST.

Qualifying 
Qualifying was held on Wednesday, July 23, at 5:10 PM CST. Since Eldora Speedway is a dirt track, the qualifying system used is a single-car, two-lap system with only one round. Whoever sets the fastest time in the round wins the pole.

* - Had to qualify on speed.

Qualifying heat races 
Drivers will be split into five different heat races, all 10 laps, and their finish will determine the starting lineup. Drivers who finish in the top 5 in each heat will advance into the main event. The remaining drivers will compete in the "last chance" qualifier race, which will be 15 laps, and whoever finishes in the top 5, advances.

Race 1

Race 2

Race 3

Race 4

Race 5

"Last Chance" qualifier race

Starting lineup

Race results 
Laps: 150

References 

NASCAR races at Eldora Speedway
July 2014 sports events in the United States
2014 in sports in Ohio